When You're Young may refer to:

Songs
"When You Are Young", song by Suede (band) from Night Thoughts (album) 2016
When You're Young (The Jam song)
When You're Young (3 Doors Down song)
"When You're Young", song by The Atlantics	1978
"When You're Young", song by Dick James	1958
"When You're Young", song by The Ivy League (band)	Carter, Lewis 1966
"When You're Young", song by Magna Carta (band) Peter Hart, R.S.O. Camden	1971
"When You're Young", song by Roy Shirley	1973

See also
When You're Young and in Love